Olivarez is a census-designated place (CDP) in Hidalgo County, Texas. The population was 3,827 at the 2010 United States Census. It is part of the McAllen–Edinburg–Mission Metropolitan Statistical Area.

Geography
Olivarez is located at  (26.236325, -97.993523).

Demographics
As of the census of 2000, there were 2,445 people, 511 households, and 481 families residing in the CDP. The population density was 663.1 people per square mile (255.8/km2). There were 562 housing units at an average density of 152.4/sq mi (58.8/km2). The racial makeup of the CDP was 95.05% White, 0.04% African American, 0.78% Asian, 3.48% from other races, and 0.65% from two or more races. Hispanic or Latino of any race were 97.22% of the population.

There were 511 households, out of which 70.8% had children under the age of 18 living with them, 77.9% were married couples living together, 12.1% had a female householder with no husband present, and 5.7% were non-families. 4.5% of all households were made up of individuals, and 1.4% had someone living alone who was 65 years of age or older. The average household size was 4.76 and the average family size was 4.88.

In the CDP, the population was spread out, with 41.7% under the age of 18, 13.0% from 18 to 24, 27.6% from 25 to 44, 13.7% from 45 to 64, and 4.0% who were 65 years of age or older. The median age was 22 years. For every 100 females, there were 101.4 males. For every 100 females age 18 and over, there were 99.4 males.

The median income for a household in the CDP was $28,636, and the median income for a family was $26,641. Males had a median income of $20,809 versus $15,469 for females. The per capita income for the CDP was $7,294. About 36.2% of families and 41.1% of the population were below the poverty line, including 49.5% of those under age 18 and 9.5% of those age 65 or over.

Education
Olivarez is served by the Weslaco Independent School District. Portions of the community are zoned to multiple elementary schools: "Rudy" Silva, Justice Gonzales, and Mario Ybarra. Two middle schools, Beatriz Garza and Mary Hoge, serve sections of Olivarez. Weslaco High School and Weslaco East High School serve sections of Olivarez.

In addition, South Texas Independent School District operates magnet schools that serve the community.

References

Census-designated places in Hidalgo County, Texas
Census-designated places in Texas